Sompal Shastri or Sompal Singh Shastri born on 20 January 1942 in a Farmer-Jat family and began his career as a politician of Rashtriya Lok Dal from Uttar Pradesh India. He has been Minister for Agriculture for the national government and a member of the Planning Commission. He is Vice Chairman, State Planning Board, Madhya Pradesh.

Sompal won in 1998 defeating Rashtriya Lok Dal's chief Chaudhary Ajit Singh from Baghpat. But lost to Chaudhary Ajit Singh in 1999 by a margin of over 1.54 lakh votes.

Sompal's father was Raghubir Singh Shastri, and represented Baghpat in the fourth Lok Sabha. He graduated from Boys High School in Allahabad now Prayagraj, 1957; B.A. Hons. (Economics), Delhi University, 1961;  M.A. (Economics), Delhi University, 1964;  LL.B., Delhi University, 1967.

In September 2013, Sompal Shastri refused to contest Lok Sabha polls under the Samajwadi Party banner. In a letter written to party president Mulayam Singh Yadav, Mr. Shastri said he was not in a position to contest the Lok Sabha polls from Baghpat after the violence in which over 38 people were killed. The incidents of communal violence in Muzaffarnagar, Shamli and Baghpat were unfortunate, he said.

References

External links 
 India Today Cover story Winners of 1998

People from Bagpat district
People from Haridwar
1942 births
Living people
India MPs 1998–1999
Agriculture Ministers of India
Delhi University alumni
Bharatiya Janata Party politicians from Uttar Pradesh
Lok Sabha members from Uttar Pradesh
Rajya Sabha members from Uttar Pradesh
Samajwadi Party politicians
Janata Dal politicians
Rashtriya Janata Dal politicians